Orlando Bridgeman, 1st Earl of Bradford (19 March 1762 – 7 September 1825) was a British peer and politician who sat in the House of Commons from 1784 to 1800.

Bridgeman was the son of the 1st Baron Bradford and his wife Elizabeth Simpson, daughter of Reverend John Simpson. He was educated at Harrow School, London, and at Trinity College, Cambridge.

At the 1784 general election, Bridgeman was returned unopposed as Member of Parliament (MP) for Wigan. He was returned unopposed for Wigan again in 1790 and 1796.  His elder brother Henry Simpson Bridgeman had died in 1782 so he succeeded to his father's titles on 5 June 1800 and vacated his seat in the House of Commons. On 30 November 1815, he was made Viscount Newport, in the County of Shropshire and Earl of Bradford, in the County of Shropshire. Bradford died aged 63 in Weston Park in Staffordshire.

Family
Lord Bradford married Hon. Lucy Elizabeth Byng, daughter of the 4th Viscount Torrington, on 29 May 1788. They had four sons and a daughter:

 George Augustus Frederick Henry Bridgeman, 2nd Earl of Bradford (1789–1865)
 Vice-Admiral the Hon. Charles Orlando Bridgeman (1791–1860), married Eliza Caroline Chamberlain, daughter of Sir Henry Chamberlain, 1st Baronet, on 2 January 1819
 Lady Lucy Georgiana Elizabeth Whitmore (1792–1840), married William Wolryche-Whitmore
 Hon. Orlando Henry Bridgeman (1794–1827), married Lady Selina Needham, daughter of the 5th Earl of Kilmorey, on 5 July 1817
 Rev. Hon. Henry Edmund Bridgeman (1795–1872), married his cousin Louisa Elizabeth Simpson, daughter of Hon. John Simpson on 25 August 1820. Simpson was the son of the 1st Baron Bradford but took the name of Simpson in 1785.

References

1762 births
1825 deaths
Alumni of Trinity College, Cambridge
British MPs 1784–1790
British MPs 1790–1796
British MPs 1796–1800
1
Members of the Parliament of Great Britain for English constituencies
People educated at Harrow School
Politics of the Metropolitan Borough of Wigan
Orlando
Peers of the United Kingdom created by George III